Airdrie and Coatbridge Tramways operated a tramway service in Airdrie and Coatbridge between 1904 and 1922 when it was taken over by Glasgow Corporation Tramways.

History

British Electric Traction established the Airdrie and Coatbridge Tramways Company to operate this single line tramway between Airdrie and Coatbridge.

Some buses were acquired by the company in October 1911 to run complementary services.

Fleet

1-12 Brush Electrical Engineering Company 1904
13-15 Brush Electrical Engineering Company 1905

Closure

The tramway was purchased for £77,550 (equivalent to £ in )  by Airdrie and Coatbridge Corporations and a connection was made on 30 December 1920 with the Glasgow Corporation Tramways between Coatbridge and Bailleston.

The tramway was acquired by Glasgow Corporation Tramways on 1 January 1922 for the sum of £82,250(equivalent to £ in ).

References

Tram transport in Scotland
4 ft 7¾ in gauge railways in Scotland
Transport in North Lanarkshire
Airdrie, North Lanarkshire
Coatbridge